Francesco Antonazzi (6 May 1924 – 25 February 1995) was an Italian footballer. He played in more than 250 matches for S.S. Lazio between 1946 and 1956. He was also part of Italy's squad for the football tournament at the 1948 Summer Olympics, but he did not play in any matches.

References

External links
 

1924 births
1995 deaths
Italian footballers
Association football defenders
S.S. Lazio players